MF Bol is a passenger ferry owned and operated by Jadrolinija, the Croatian state-owned ferry company.

Ferries of Croatia